Nick DeSimone (born November 21, 1994) is an American professional ice hockey defenseman currently playing for the Calgary Wranglers in the American Hockey League (AHL) while under contract to the Calgary Flames of the National Hockey League (NHL).

Playing career
He played college hockey at Union Colege. Undrafted, signed an NHL contract with the Calgary Flames in July 2022 and played in his first NHL game on November 8, 2022.

Career statistics

Awards and honors

References

External links

Living people
1994 births
Calgary Flames players
Calgary Wranglers players
Rochester Americans players
San Jose Barracuda players
Stockton Heat players
Undrafted National Hockey League players
Union Dutchmen ice hockey players